Donal William Morphy (12 December 1900 – 25 May 1975) was a British electrical engineer from Kent who formed Morphy Richards in July 1936 with engineer Charles Richards.

Early life
From 1917 to 1920 he studied electrical engineering at the City and Guilds College (now part of Imperial College London).

Career

Morphy Richards
He formed Morphy Richards with Charles Richards on 8 July 1936. Charles Richards died aged 64 on Sunday 15 November 1964.

Personal life
He married Margaret Clare Sherring (born 12 May 1900) on 3 August 1923 in Surrey. They had a daughter on 22 September 1928. He died in West Sussex aged 74 in May 1975. He lived at Peasons in Chislehurst then at Byworth in West Sussex in the 1960s. His wife died on 20 May 1982.

See also
 Peter Hobbs (engineer), former Morphy Richards employee, who formed Russell Hobbs in 1952

References
 Times obituary, Tuesday 27 May 1975, page 14

External links
 Grace's Guide
 Morphy Richards

1900 births
1975 deaths
Alumni of Imperial College London
British electrical engineers
English company founders
Manufacturing company founders
People from Chislehurst
20th-century English businesspeople